Puya herzogii is a species in the genus Puya. This species is endemic to Bolivia.

References

herzogii
Flora of Bolivia